Josef Beránek (6 December 1891 – 6 July 1959) was a Czech wrestler. He competed for Bohemia at the 1912 Summer Olympics and for Czechoslovakia at the 1920 Summer Olympics and 1924 Summer Olympics.

References

External links
 

1891 births
1959 deaths
Olympic wrestlers of Bohemia
Olympic wrestlers of Czechoslovakia
Wrestlers at the 1912 Summer Olympics
Wrestlers at the 1920 Summer Olympics
Wrestlers at the 1924 Summer Olympics
Czech male sport wrestlers
Sportspeople from Havlíčkův Brod